The Hopkins Center for Health Disparities Solutions (HCHDS), a research center within the Johns Hopkins Bloomberg School of Public Health, strives to eradicate disparities in health and health care among racial and ethnic groups, socioeconomic groups, and geopolitical categories such as urban, rural, and suburban populations.

The HCHDS works collaboratively with community-based organizations, historically black colleges, and minority serving institutions to advance knowledge on the causes of health and health care disparities and develop interventions to eliminate them. Specifically, the HCHDS has collaborated with JHU- based organizational entities as well as the National Institute on Aging, Laboratory of the Cellular and Molecular Biology of the Gerontology Research Center; Shaw University; Operation Reach Out South West (OROSW); and Nora, LLC. The HCHDS has been designated as a national Comprehensive Center of Excellence in Health Disparities by the NCMHD of the National Institutes of Health, and in 2007 was awarded a second 5-year grant to continue its work. The center has a national focus although much of the actual work takes place in the local Baltimore, Maryland community.

History
The Hopkins Center for Health Disparities Solutions was established in October 2002 with a 5-year grant from the National Center for Minority Health and Health Disparities (NCMHD), of the National Institutes of Health (NIH) under the Centers of Excellence in Partnerships for Community Outreach, Research on Health Disparities, and Training program (Project EXPORT).

Mission "Exploration and Intervention for Health Equality..."
The mission of the Hopkins Center for Health Disparities Solutions is to generate and disseminate knowledge to reduce racial/ethnic and social class disparities in health status and health care through research, training, community partnerships, and advocacy.

Research

Exploring Health Disparities in Integrated Communities Study (EHDIC)
This is a large-scale collaborative study consisting of determinants of disparities in chronic conditions. Progress in understanding the nature of health disparities requires  data that are race-comparative while overcoming confounding between race, socioeconomic status (SES), and segregation. The EHDIC study is a multi-cohort study that addresses these confounders by examining the nature of health disparities within racially integrated communities without racial disparities in SES.

College Health and Wellness Study
Overweight and obesity is an epidemic in the United States, particularly among minority populations. This epidemic contributes to the development of chronic conditions that occur later in life such as Type 2 diabetes and hypertension. The center conducted a cross-sectional survey among students graduating from a  Historically Black College or University (HBCU) in the Mid-Atlantic Region. Participants were 392 predominately African- American seniors graduating in the spring of 2003. Data were collected using a self-administered paper and pencil questionnaire which focuses on weight, weight management activities, weight history, and health status indicators.

Measuring Trust in Health Care
This is a study to examine the validity of the psychometric properties of a new measure of trust or mistrust of medical care systems. Trust is the foundation of the interrelationships that make civil society possible and the importance of trust within healthcare is no less critical. Patients are inherently vulnerable within medical encounters and must be trustful of the multiple institutional entities and individuals involved in their care. Patients must trust that individual healthcare providers are competent and will have their best interests in mind while making treatment decisions. They must trust that the pharmaceutical companies have developed effective drugs and that the regulatory agencies have adequately monitored them. And, they must trust that the healthcare organization and that its staff will manage their medical information with discretion and confidentially.

Developing Measures of Parental Knowledge in Physical Activity
Parental knowledge of child health and development issues can have important effects on child health.  Greater awareness of the content areas in which parents require more guidance can help clinicians devise parent-centered strategies to reduce identified knowledge deficits and may both increase the quality of care and reduce disparities in child health.  The primary goal of this pilot project is to develop a set of parental health knowledge assessment questions relevant to physical activity in children 5 years or younger and to conduct preliminary reliability and validity studies 
of these questions.

Training and education
The Kellogg Community Scholars and The Urban Health Institute Fellows are both Postdoctoral training opportunities found at Johns Hopkins Bloomberg School of Public Health that address health disparities-related issues.

Kellogg Community Scholars
The goal of the Community Health Scholars Program (CHSP) is to increase the number of faculty at health professional schools, with an emphasis on schools of public health, who possess the capacity to carry out community-based participatory research and teaching and who understand determinants of community health and how to build the capacity of communities, health-related agencies and academic centers to function as equal partners in community-based research, service and education.

Urban Health Institute Fellows
The goal of the UHI Postdoctoral Research Fellowship program is to promote future leaders in the field of urban health research. The fellows, each working in tandem with a Hopkins faculty member, carry out scholarly research and publication on such issues as crime, unemployment, poverty, substance abuse, diabetes, hypertension and other chronic diseases.

Graduate training opportunities
In addition to offering Doctoral and master's degrees, the Bloomberg School of Public Health also offers certificates of concentration in subspecialties in public health.  Thus, a student can obtain a Doctoral or master's degree from any one of the ten departments that comprise the Bloomberg School of Public Health, and also earn an optional certificate in a specialized topic area. The school currently offers certificates in 21 topic areas. The program is open to students enrolled in any graduate degree program at Johns Hopkins University.

Publications
 Gibbons, Michael. eHealth Solutions for Healthcare Disparities. New York: Springer, 2007.
 LaVeist, Thomas. Race, Ethnicity, and Health. San Francisco: Jossey-Bass, 2002.
 LaVeist, Thomas. Minority Populations and Health. San Francisco: Jossey-Bass, 2005.

Notable persons/staff
 Thomas LaVeist, PhD, Director
 Darrell Gaskin, PhD, Deputy Director
 Roland Thorpe Jr, PhD, Project Director
 Cheri Wilson, MA, MHS, CPHQ, COA360 and CQC Program Director
 Diane Griffin, Administrative Coordinator
 Caryn Bell, PhD candidate, Research Assistant/Consultant
 Rachael McCleary, Research Assistant
 Paulette Mensah, Research Assistant
 Alejandro Orengo, Communications Coordinator

Research publications
 LaVeist T, Thorpe R Jr, Bowen-Reid T, Jackson J, Gary T, Gaskin D, Browne D."Exploring Health Disparities in Integrated Communities: Overview of the EHDIC Study." Journal of Urban Health. 2008 Jan;85(1):11-21. 2007 Nov 13.
 Thorpe R Jr, Brandon DT, LaVeist T. "Social Context as an Explanation for Race Disparities in Hypertension: Findings From The Exploring Health Disparities in Integrated Communities (EHDIC) Study." Social Science Medicine. 2008 Nov; 67(10):1604-11. 2009 May 22.
 Blackburn, Maria. "Measuring a hospital's cultural competency." Johns Hopkins Magazine. 2008. May 28, 2009. <http://www.jhu.edu/~jhumag/0908web/wholly.html#cultural>.
 Bell, C. N., Bowie, J. V., & Thorpe, R. J. (2010). The interrelationship between hypertension and blood pressure, attendance at religious services, and race/ethnicity. Journal of Religion and Health Epub 2010 Mar 31. NIHMSID: NIHMS365567
 Gaskin DJ, Spencer CS, Richard P, Anderson G, Powe NR, LaVeist TA "Do Minority Patients Use Lower Quality Hospitals?" Inquiry. 2011 Fall;48(3):209-20
 Samuel, L., Szanton, S.L., Weiss, C., Thorpe, R.J., Semba, R., Fried, L.P. "Financial Strain is associated with risk of malnutrition in community-dwelling older women." (2012) Epidemiology Research International. doi:10.1155/2012/696518
 Gross S, Gary T, Browne D, LaVeist T. "Gender Differences in Body Image and Health Perceptions Among Graduating Seniors from a Historically Black College." Journal National Medical Association. 2005; 97:1608-1619. 2009 May 22.
 Szanton, S.L., Taylor, H.A., Terhaar, M.T. (2013) "Development of an IRB pre-approval process for DNP students:  process and outcomes" Journal of Nursing Education Jan;52(1)51-5.
 Yong R, Lee SH, Freishtat H, Bleich SN, Gittelsohn J (2013).  Availability of Healthy Foods in Prepared Food Sources in Urban Public Markets. Journal of Hunger & Environmental Nutrition. 7:468-481.
 Additional Publications

References

Health care quality
Determinants of health
Schools of public health in the United States